Chris Moore is an American record producer, mixer, and recording engineer currently based in New York, New York.  He has produced, recorded and mixed albums by Midnight Juggernauts, TV On The Radio, Scarlett Johansson, Yeah Yeah Yeahs, Yeasayer, Au Revoir Simone, Foals, Dragons of Zynth, and The Ohsees.

Biography
Chris Moore was born in Baltimore, Maryland, United States, and began playing and recording music as a teenager. After working on a number of solo electronic projects and low-budget independent bands in the 1990s, he moved to New York City in 2002 and began working with local artists such as TV On The Radio, Yeah Yeah Yeahs, and Liars. In addition to producing, recording, and mixing, Moore is also a keyboard player and synthesizer programmer who has created custom synth sounds for bands such as Midnight Juggernauts, Yeah Yeah Yeahs, Scarlett Johansson, and Suckers. Moore has also worked with a number of producers on remixes.

Selected discography

Sebastien Tellier "A Girl Is a Gun" (mix) 2017 Record Makers

Kent "La Grande Illusion" (mix) 2017

Erotic Market "Should I" EP (mix) 2016

Tahiti Boy & The Palmtree Family "Songs of Vertigo" (mix, additional recording) 2015 Edge of Town

Chocolat "Tss Tss" LP (mix) 2015 Grosse Boite

Believe in Baltimore Lower Dens/Future Islands/Celebration/Baltimore student collaboration 2015 (mix) 

Cologne "Sacred/Mine" single (mix) 2015 Hit City

Tahiti Boy & The Palmtree Family "All That You Are" EP (mix, add'l recording) 2014 Edge of Town

Erotic Market "BlahBlahrians" LP (mix) 2014 Jarring Effects

David Giguere "Casablanca" LP (mix) 2014 Audiogram

The Blow "The Blow" LP (mix, synthesizer) 2013 Kanine

Jimmy Hunt "Maladie d'Amour" LP (mix) 2013 Dare to Care

Aaron Cohen "Potential Fans" Mixtape, "Stanley Kubrick" single (mix) 2013 Decon

Pien Feith "Tough Love" LP (production, recording, synthesizers, mix) 2013 V2 Benelux

Tahiti Boy & The Palmtree Family "Fireman" EP (mix) 2012 Edge Of Town

Alice Cohen "Pink Keys" LP (mix, overdubs) 2012 Olde English Spelling Bee/Crinoline

Black Marble "A Different Arrangement" (mix, mastering) 2012 Hardly Art

Sofa Club "Actual Video" EP (mix) 2012 Muscular

Tijuana Cartel "M1" LP and "White Dove" EP (production, recording, mix, synthesizers) 2011 self-released

Thank You "Golden Worry"LP (mix) 2011 Thrill Jockey

Midnight Juggernauts "The Crystal Axis" LP, "Vital Signs" single, "This New Technology" single, (rec/mix/keyboards) 2009–10 Siberia/Acephale

Rain Machine LP (mix/overdubs) 2009 Anti

Miles Benjamin Anthony Robinson "Summer Of Fear" LP (vocal rec/mix) 2009 Saddle Creek

Scarlett Johansson "Anywhere I Lay My Head" 2008 (recording/mix/keyboards) Rhino

Suckers "Wild Smile" LP (production/rec/mix) Frenchkiss, "Suckers" EP 2009 (production/rec/mix) IAMSOUND, "Save Your Love For Me" 7" (production/rec) Insound

Yeasayer "All Hour Cymbals" 2008 (mix) We Are Free

Yeah Yeah Yeahs "Is Is" 2008 (mix-live tracks), "It's Blitz" 2009 (recording) Interscope

Holly Miranda "The Magician's Private Library" LP 2010 (recording/mix) XL Recordings

TV On The Radio "Young Liars", "Desperate Youth...", "Return to Cookie Mountain", "Dear Science", various singles, etc. 2003-8 (recording/mix/inst) Interscope/4AD/Touch And Go

Dave Sitek "With a Girl Like You" from "Dark Was The Night" benefit comp 2009 (mix) 4AD

Thee OhSees "Singles Collection" 2009, "The Master's Bedroom..." 2008, "Sux Blood" 2007, "Cool Death Of Island Raiders" 2006 (recording/mix/mastering) Narnack/Tom/etc

Foals "Antidotes" 2008 (recording) Transgressive/Sub Pop

Au Revoir Simone "The Bird Of Music" 2007 (mix) Moshi Moshi

Liars "They Were Wrong So We Drowned" 2004 (mix) Mute

plus remixes for The Knife, Beck, Queens Of The Stone Age, Nat King Cole, Lee Scratch Perry, Gary B and the Notions, Alice Cohen, and more

References

External links
Official Website
Contact
Credits/discography

Year of birth missing (living people)
Living people
Record producers from Maryland
American audio engineers